15 Firwood Fold is a 16th-century house in Bolton, Greater Manchester, England. It is a Grade II* listed building and according to local tradition is the oldest inhabited house in Bolton. It stands separate from the other houses in Firwood Fold.

The house was originally built in a medieval style using the cruck construction technique, whereby A-shaped oak trusses on stone bases were covered in wattle and daub and thatch. It was later renovated and clad in stone. One of the trusses can be clearly seen in the gable end.

Gallery

See also

Grade II* listed buildings in Greater Manchester
Listed buildings in Bolton
10 Firwood Fold

References

Grade II* listed buildings in Greater Manchester
Buildings and structures in Bolton